Nikolai Ilyich Belyaev (19 January (1 February) 1903 – 28 October 1966) was a Soviet politician. Between 1955 and 1958 he was a Secretariat of the Central Committee of the Communist Party of the Soviet Union.

Biography
Belyaev was born in the village Kuterem of Ufa Governorate in Siberia in a family of a Russian peasant. While studying in a secondary school he began his political career as a Komsomol activist. In 1925 he graduated from the Plekhanov Russian University of Economics in Moscow and returned to Siberia where he served as a Communist Party functionary for the next 30 years. His efforts in the expansion of agriculture in Siberia were noticed by Nikita Khrushchev. As a result, in 1955 Belyaev became one of the secretaries of the Central Committee of the Communist Party of the Soviet Union. During the 1957 attempt by Malenkov, Molotov and Kaganovich to demote Khrushchev, Belyaev defended the party leader, for which he was elected to the Presidium of the Supreme Soviet and became the First Secretary of the Central Committee of the Communist Party of Kazakhstan. His was dismissed from both positions in 1960 due to the decline in agriculture and, more importantly, due to the poor handling of the 1959 riots in Temirtau that resulted in more than 10 people shot dead and several dozens prosecuted. He was sent to Stavropol Krai where he worked with Mikhail Gorbachev. According to Gorbachev, after the demotion Belyaev lost all enthusiasm; he retired from active duties in 1960 and died in 1966. He was buried at the Novodevichy Cemetery in Moscow.

References

1903 births
1966 deaths
People from Bashkortostan
People from Birsky Uyezd
Politburo of the Central Committee of the Communist Party of the Soviet Union members
Secretariat of the Central Committee of the Communist Party of the Soviet Union members
First Secretaries of the Communist Party of Kazakhstan
Second convocation members of the Supreme Soviet of the Soviet Union
Third convocation members of the Supreme Soviet of the Soviet Union
Fourth convocation members of the Supreme Soviet of the Soviet Union
Fifth convocation members of the Supreme Soviet of the Soviet Union
Plekhanov Russian University of Economics alumni
Recipients of the Order of Lenin
Recipients of the Order of the Red Banner of Labour
Burials at Novodevichy Cemetery